The Lawrence O. Poncin is a United States Army Reserve facility located in Attleboro, Massachusetts.

See also
List of military installations in Massachusetts

References

Installations of the U.S. Army in Massachusetts
Attleboro, Massachusetts